is a train station in Nakagyō-ku, Kyoto, Japan.

Lines
 
 Sagano Line (Sanin Main Line)
 
  (Station Number: T15)

Layout

JR West

The station has one elevated island platform between two tracks. The station building was designed by Urabesekkei, an architectural firm based in Osaka. Prior to the platform elevation, the station was only accessible from the east (Sembon Street side), but the station renovation made it accessible from both the east and west sides.

The design elements of the former station building were evocative of nearby Nijō Castle. The building was dismantled and rebuilt at the Kyoto Railway Museum (then called the Umekoji Steam Locomotive Museum) in 1996.

Kyoto Subway

Subway station has one underground island platform with two tracks, separated by platform screen doors.

History
Nijō Station opened on 15 February 1897 and was the terminus of the Kyoto Railway (present-day San'in Main Line) until 27 April of the same year. The original station building was moved to its current location at the Kyoto Railway Museum on 1 April 1996. The Tōzai Line subway opened on 12 October 1997. The Tōzai line was extended to the Uzumasa Tenjingawa Station on 16 January 2008.

Station numbering was introduced to the JR West platforms in March 2018 with Nijō being assigned station number JR-E04.

Ridership

Surrounding area

East Side 
The Shinsenen and the Nijō Castle are within walking distance, however in case of traveling via subway, the adjacent station of Nijōjō-mae is closer.

 Ritsumeikan University Nijō Campus.
 Bukkyo University Nijō Campus.
Senbon Street
Life Supermarket Nijo Station Store

West Side 

 BiVi Nijō.

Buses

Nijo-eki-nishiguchi
Kyoto City Bus
Route 66 for 
Airport limousine
for Osaka International Airport (Osaka Airport Transport Co., Ltd.)
for Kansai International Airport (Kansai Airport Transportation Enterprise Co., Ltd.)

Nijo-ekimae
Kyoto City Bus
Route 6 for Shijo Omiya / for Bukkyo University and Gentaku
Route 15 for Shijo Kawaramachi and  Keihan via Oike Street / for Emmachi and Ritsumeikan University
Route 46 for Gion and Heian Shrine / for Kamigamo Shrine via Sembon Street
Route 55 for Shijo Omiya and Shijo Karasuma / for Kitano Tenman-gu and Ritsumeikan University
Route 66 for Katsura-eki-higashiguchi / for Nijo-eki-nishiguchi
Route 201 for Mibu and Gion / for Sembon Imadegawa and Hyakuman-ben
Route 206 for Nanajo Omiya and Kyoto Station / for Sembon Kitaoji and 
Rapid buses for Bukkyo University / Rapid buses for Ritsumeikan University
Kyoto Bus Co., Ltd.
Route 61 for Arashiyama and Daikaku-ji via Marutamachi Street and Kyoto Studio Park / for Sanjo Keihan via Shijo Kawaramachi
Route 62 for Arashiyama and Kiyotaki via Marutamachi Street and Kyoto Studio Park / for Sanjo Keihan via Horikawa Oike (Nijo Castle),  and Shijo Kawaramachi
Route 63 for Arashiyama, Koke-dera and Suzumushi-dera via Marutamachi Street and Kyoto Studio Park / for Sanjo Keihan via Shijo Kawaramachi
Route 65 for Arashiyama and Arisugawa via Marutamachi Street and Kyoto Studio Park
West JR Bus Company
for Kyoto Station / for Toganoo and Shuzan

References

External links

  Nijō Station page from JR West website
  Nijō Station page from Kyoto city website

Railway stations in Kyoto Prefecture
Railway stations in Japan opened in 1897
Railway stations in Japan opened in 1997
Railway stations in Kyoto
Sanin Main Line